Cervera del Maestre is a municipality in the comarca of Baix Maestrat in the Valencian Community, Spain. It is located at the southern end of the Cervera Mountains, above the Rambla de Cervera seasonal river.

Cervera is located on a hill with a ruined Moorish castle top of it. It lies in an area of maquis shrub and cultivated plots, mainly almond, carob and olive trees. There is a ruined ermita south of the town.

Cervera del Maestre is part of the Taula del Sénia free association of municipalities.

References

External links 

 Cervera del Maestre
 Casa del dragon, artist residence
 Paco González Ramírez - País Valencià, poble a poble, comarca a comarca
 Institut Valencià d'Estadística.
 Portal de la Direcció General d'Administració Local de la Generalitat.
Butlletí d’Informació Municipal
 

Municipalities in the Province of Castellón
Baix Maestrat